Parminder Singh was a former Indian association football player. He was part of the team that played at the 1984 AFC Asian Cup, and also played for JCT Mills in domestic leagues.

Playing career
He represented the India national team from 1975 to 1986. He was declared as Best Player of the decade by AIFF in the year 1992. He represented "Asian All Star" Football Team in 1982.  He also played two matches against Brazil for Asian All-star XI and played against Zico, Eder, Falcao, Socretes and others. He has set a record of playing 19 years for JCT and during his playing career he represented JCT in 19 Federation Cups, 19 Santosh Trophies. He joined JCT as Football Coach in the year 1995. He is graduate and has done Diploma in Football Coaching From Sports Authority of India and has undergone AFC A License course,AFC B Licence Course, AFC C Licence Course, AFC C Licence Conditioning, AFC B Licence Conditioning Course FIFA Futuro-III Administration & Management Course.

Honours

India
 South Asian Games Gold medal: 1985

See also
List of India national football team captains

References

India international footballers
1984 AFC Asian Cup players
Living people
1957 births
Association football midfielders
Indian footballers
Footballers from Punjab, India
People from Sahibzada Ajit Singh Nagar district
Footballers at the 1982 Asian Games
Asian Games competitors for India
South Asian Games medalists in football
South Asian Games gold medalists for India